Kolleen Park (born May 1, 1967) is an American-born South Korean-Lithuanian musical director, conductor, and actress, and is also a judge on the Korean talent show Korea's Got Talent.

Background
Kolleen was born in the United States to a Korean father and an American mother of Lithuanian descent. Kolleen has two sisters named Kim and Kelly. She is bilingual, being fluent in both English and Korean.

She has a bachelor's degree in cello from California Institute of the Arts and a master's degree from Seoul National University's Graduate School of Music in traditional Korean music.

Career
Kolleen currently serves as artistic director for Kyyk Musical Studio and as head professor at Howon University.

She was the conductor for the musical "Aida", the Korean version of Disney's first original Broadway musical rather than the opera, which was the most popular show in Korea at the end of 2010 and topped the booking rankings for December that were compiled by Inter Park.

Kolleen performed her one-woman show "This is Kolleen" to open the 2011 Seoul Jazz Festival.

In 2011, she also directed the Korean production of Rent.

Kolleen starred in the Korean production of the rock musical "Next to Normal" starting November 18, 2011.

References

External links 
 http://news.sbs.co.kr/section_news/news_read.jsp?news_id=N1000508079
 http://cafe.naver.com/kyyk/339
 https://web.archive.org/web/20110823054121/http://news.tvreport.co.kr/main.php?cmd=news%2Fnews_view&idx=54471
 http://star.mk.co.kr/new/view.php?mc=ST&no=102665&year=2011

Living people
American people of Korean descent
1967 births
South Korean conductors (music)
California Institute of the Arts alumni
South Korean women
South Korean people of Lithuanian descent
American people of Lithuanian descent
21st-century conductors (music)
Seoul National University alumni